Gompholobium latifolium, commonly known as golden glory pea or broad-leaved wedge-pea,  is a plant in the pea family Fabaceae and is endemic to eastern Australia. It is a  small shrub with leaves composed of three leaflets and which has relatively large yellow flowers in spring and early summer.

Description
The leaves have a very short stalk and are darker on the upper surface.

They are lance-shaped, dark green and glabrous on the outside and covered with flattened, matted hairs on the inside.

Taxonomy and naming
Gompholobium latifolium was first formally described in 1805 by James Edward Smith and the description was published in Annals of Botany. The specific epithet (latifolium) is from the Latin words latus meaning "broad" and folium meaning "a leaf"  referring to the broad leaves.

Distribution and habitat
Golden glory pea grows in dry sclerophyll forest in Queensland, New South Wales and Victoria in sandy soil. It is most common in New South Wales where it is widespread along the coast and nearby ranges. It is uncommon in Victoria.

Use in horticulture
Although a desirable species with its large yellow pea flowers, G. latifolium is uncommon in gardens. It can be propagated easily from seed but viable seeds are often hard to obtain. The seeds must be boiled or scratched before they will germinate.

References

latifolium
Fabales of Australia
Flora of New South Wales
Plants described in 1805